The following is a list of Canadian ambassadors to Venezuela.  The embassy closed in 2019 and consular services are to be handled in Colombia.

References

Canada
Venezuela